Metalia is a genus of echinoderms belonging to the family Brissidae.

The genus has almost cosmopolitan distribution.

Species:

Metalia agariciformis 
Metalia angustus 
Metalia cartagensis 
Metalia dicrana 
Metalia dubia 
Metalia jamaicensis 
Metalia kermadecensis 
Metalia latissima 
Metalia nobilis 
Metalia palmeri 
Metalia pelagica 
Metalia persica 
Metalia robillardi 
Metalia spatagus 
Metalia sternalis 
Metalia townsendi 
Metalia waylandi

References

Echinoidea genera
Brissidae